The 2008 Open de Tenis Comunidad Valenciana was a men's tennis tournament played on outdoor clay courts. It was the 14th edition of the Open de Tenis Comunidad Valenciana, and was part of the International Series of the 2008 ATP Tour. It took place at the Club de Tenis Valencia in Valencia, Spain, from 12 April through 20 April 2008.

The singles field featured ATP No. 5, 2007 Tennis Masters Cup runner-up and Australian Open quarterfinalist David Ferrer, Viña del Mar runner-up Juan Mónaco, and 2007 Metz titlist Tommy Robredo. Other players competing were Auckland finalist Juan Carlos Ferrero, Costa do Sauípe and Acapulco champion Nicolás Almagro, Igor Andreev, Fernando Verdasco and Potito Starace.

First-seeded David Ferrer won the singles title.

Finals

Singles

 David Ferrer defeated  Nicolás Almagro, 4–6, 6–2, 7–6(7–2)
It was David Ferrer's 1st title of the year, and his 6th overall.

Doubles

 Máximo González /  Juan Mónaco defeated  Travis Parrott /  Filip Polášek, 7–5, 7–5

References

External links
Official website
Singles draw
Doubles draw
Qualifying Singles draw

 
Val
Valencia Open
Val
Valenciana